The New Zealand women's national under-18 ice hockey team is the women's national under-18 ice hockey team of New Zealand. The team is controlled by New Zealand Ice Hockey Federation, a member of the International Ice Hockey Federation. The team entered their first World Women's U18 Championship tournaments in 2020.

History
New Zealand played their first game on 6 December 2013 against Australia in Dunedin, tying 2–2. The game was part of a four-game series being held in Dunedin between two teams. New Zealand went on to win the remaining three games of the series, which included their largest recorded international win of 5–1 in the final game. On 30 May and 1 June 2014, New Zealand played two games against the Auckland under-16 representative team, losing both games 9–1 and 4–0 respectively. In December 2014, New Zealand travelled to Australia to compete in a five-game series against Australia at the Medibank Icehouse in Melbourne. The team lost the series two games to three and also recorded their largest international loss in game four, losing 8–1 to Australia.

In March 2017, New Zealand participated at the 2017 IIHF Women's Challenge Cup of Asia. This was the first time New Zealand had sent a team to this tournament. The team was undefeated throughout the tournament and gained their biggest win so far of 16–1 against the United Arab Emirates. The team were also by far the youngest team to compete with an average age of 16 years. They defeated the women's (senior) national teams of Asia including Thailand, Singapore, India, Philippines, Malaysia, and the United Arab Emirates.

International competitions

World Women's U18 Championship
2020 IIHF World Women's U18 Championship. Finish: 4th in Division II Group B (28th overall)

Women's Challenge Cup of Asia
2017 IIHF Women's Challenge Cup of Asia. Finish: 1st
2018 IIHF Women's Challenge Cup of Asia. Finish: 2nd
2019 IIHF Women's Challenge Cup of Asia. Finish: 4th

Players and personnel

Team roster - 2014 Series with Australia
From the 2014 International Series with Australia

Team officials - 2014 Series with Australia
From the 2014 International Series with Australia
Head coach: Brandon Contratto
Assistant coach: Alexis Debol
General Manager: Simon Thompson
Assistant manager: Jan Kolisnyk

Team roster - 2017 IIHF Challenge Cup of Asia
From the 2017 IIHF Women's Challenge Cup of Asia

Team officials - 2017 IIHF Challenge Cup of Asia
From the 2017 IIHF Women's Challenge Cup of Asia 
Head coach: Angelique Mawson
Assistant coach: Geoffroy Boehme
Assistant coach: Lyndal Heineman
General Manager: Philippa Kaisser
Physiotherapist: Suzanne Belcher
Team Staff: Jonathan Albright

Team roster - 2018 IIHF Challenge Cup of Asia

Team officials - 2018 IIHF Challenge Cup of Asia

Head coach: Angelique Mawson
Assistant coach: Michelle Cox
General Manager: Philippa Kaisser

References

External links
New Zealand Ice Hockey Federation

under
Women's national under-18 ice hockey teams